Paolo Vaccari (born 17 January 1971) is an Italian former rugby union player. He was a versatile back: he used to play as  centre, wing ,or full-back. He is currently a sports manager.

Biography
Born and raised in Calvisano, Vaccari debuted with Rugby Calvisano's senior squad on 1 February 1987 against Petrarca in Padua.
After six seasons with Calvisano he moved to Amatori Milano, then owned by Silvio Berlusconi and known as "Milan Rugby", and won an Italian title in 1995; got back to Calvisano he joined the Italian Championship's Final 6 times in a row, from 2001 to 2006, winning the title again in 2005.

Vaccari won his first cap in 1991 against Namibia in Windhoek (defeat 7–17, although he scored a try at his debut); he went on playing three consecutive editions of the Rugby World Cup (1991, 1995 and 1999).

Vaccari was part of the Italian team that won for the first time the 1997 FIRA Trophy against France. His most significant international performance was the 1997 FIRA Trophy Final, played in Grenoble, a 40–32 win which meant the first Italy win over France. The title was instrumental in Italy's admission to the Five Nations Championship, now renamed Six Nations Championship, in 2000.

Vaccari was also invited by the Barbarians to play a match in Leicester in April 1998, which he considers as "a highlight in his career".

He won his last international against Scotland during the 2003 Six Nations Championship.

In 2003 Vaccari graduated in Architecture at the Politecnico, University of Milan, together with his fellow National teammate Massimo Giovanelli.

In 2006 he retired; currently he is a member of the Board of the Italian Rugby Federation.

Honours

Club
 Italian Championships: 2
(Milan 1994-95, Calvisano 2004-05)
 Italian Cups: 2
(Milan 1994-95, Calvisano 2003-04)

National team
 FIRA Trophy: 1
 Italy: 1997
 64 caps between 1991 and 2003 (107 pts).
 3 Rugby World Cups played: 1991, 1995 and 1999
 2 Six Nations Championships played: 2002 and 2003

References

External links
 Statistics at scrum.com
 ERC bio

1971 births
Living people
Sportspeople from the Province of Brescia
Italian rugby union players
Italian sports directors
Rugby union fullbacks
Barbarian F.C. players
Italy international rugby union players
Rugby Calvisano players
Amatori Rugby Milano players